Stella Isodo Apolot is a Ugandan Legislator who as of March 2021 is the Women's Representative-elect for Ngora District. Politically, she is affiliated to the Forum for Democratic Change party.

Political career 
Apolot Isodo is affiliated to the Forum for Democratic Change (FDC) party under whose ticket she contested in Uganda's 2016 and 2021 general election. She was declared the party flagbearer in August 2020 after defeating her rival in the party primaries.

She had initially contested for the seat in 2016 and lost to Jacqueline Amongin.

Personal life 
Isodo Apolot is married to Samuel Isodo, a lawyer. She has three children: Apio Joanne, Isodo Arnold and Okiror AllanBill.

References 

21st-century Ugandan women politicians
21st-century Ugandan politicians
Living people
Year of birth missing (living people)